Count Zero is a band formed in Boston, Massachusetts in 1996 by former members of the electronic band Think Tree. The band is led by guitarist and vocalist Peter Moore. Their music has been featured on both Guitar Hero and Rock Band games.

Discography

Albums
 1997 Affluenza
 2001 Robots Anonymous (SineAppleSap)
 2005 Little Minds (SineAppleSap)
 2011 Never Be Yourself (SineAppleSap)

Singles
 2008 "Shake"

Appearances
 2006 2. Contamination: A Tribute to David Bowie (compilation by Various Artists) (Failure to Communicate FTC005-2)

References

External links

Count Zero discography at Rate Your Music

Musical groups from Boston